Transrail may refer to:

 Transrail, a Canadian consortium running Inter-city trains in Senegal and Mali
 Transrail Freight, a former freight division of British Rail

See also
 Tranz Rail, a former rail operator in New Zealand